Swathi is an Indian actress who has appeared Tamil, Kannada, Hindi and Telugu films. She is one of the lead actress from 1995 to 1999

Career
After the success of Vaanmathi, Swathi returned to Hyderabad to complete her education and turned down film offers. After a break, she returned to play a supporting role in Ameer's Yogi.

Personal life
She married a company director, Kiran, on 2 December 2009 at Maruthi Gardens, Red Hills in Hyderabad. The couple have one son.

Filmography

References

Actresses from Andhra Pradesh
Indian film actresses
Actresses in Hindi cinema
Living people
Actresses in Tamil cinema
Actresses in Telugu cinema
Actresses in Kannada cinema
20th-century Indian actresses
21st-century Indian actresses
Year of birth missing (living people)